Choe Kang-wook (Korean: 최강욱, born 24 March 1968) is a South Korean lawyer and politician who was the former President of the Open Democratic Party (ODP) from 2020 to 2022. He served as the Secretary to the President for Public Office Discipline from September 2018 to March 2020. In the 2020 election, he was elected the Member of the National Assembly.

Career

Military judicial officer 
He was qualified for the bar for military judicial officer in 1994. Prior to be transferred to major in 2005, he was the Staff Judge Advocate (SJA) of the 3rd Cops, Chief Prosecutor of the Prosecutors Office Ministry of National Defence and the Deputy Chief of the High Public Prosecutor's Office.

He took a prominent role in 2004 when he led an investigation against corruption scandals within the military. In January, he arrested and charged the then Deputy Commander of R.O.K.-U.S. Combined Forces Command Shin Il-soon for being alleged to embezzle the troop budget and public funds. The investigation was also brought to a bribery occurred at a promotion to general, in which led the then Chief of Army Staff Nam Jae-jun to resign in November. His resignation was, however, rejected by the then President Roh Moo-hyun.

Lawyer 
After being discharged in 2005, Choe worked as a lawyer, mainly focusing human rights issues within the military. He was an ombudsman at the Defence Acquisition Programme Administration, an expert member in human rights education at the National Human Rights Commission and a member of the Special Committee on Ethics of the National Assembly. In 2008, he filed a constitutional appeal for an issue of "seditious books" by the Ministry of National Defence.

He used to be a member of the Lawyers for a Democratic Society following the recommendation of Lee Jung-hee. He was also in charge for a trial related to civilian inspection of Lee Myung-bak's government.

Foundation for Broadcast Culture 
Choe became a member of board of directors (BoD) of the Foundation for Broadcast Culture from August 2012 to 2018. In 2012, he and other 2 BoD members — Seon Dong-kyu and Kwon Mi-hyuk, criticised that the dismissal proposal against the CEO of MBC, Kim Jae-chul, was failed due to governmental pressure.

Secretary to the President for Public Office Discipline 
On 5 September 2018, Choe was appointed the Secretary to the President for Public Office Discipline, replacing Kim Jong-ho who was moved to the Secretary-General of the Board of Audit and Inspection.

Politics 
He resigned on 16 March 2020. However, sources reported that he would run for the upcoming general election as a proportional representation as the date was the deadline for any civil servants to resign in order to run for the election. At the beginning he denied it, but 2 days later he was reported he had already registered as a pre-candidate of the Open Democratic Party (ODP). He was selected 2nd in the ODP list and was elected.

On 19 April, Choe was appointed the interim President of the ODP following the resignation of the incumbent Lee Keun-shik due to the poor performance in the election. Being the sole candidate running for the party's presidency, he was elected the ODP President on 12 May with the support of 99.6%.

On 26 December 2021, both the Democratic Party and the ODP agreed to merge each other, under the name of the "Democratic Party of Korea". The ODP was later merged into the Democratic Party on 18 January 2022. As a part of the agreement, Choe became one of the vice presidents of the Democratic Party.

Controversies

Cho Kuk scandal 
The Supreme Prosecutors' Office claimed that Choe helped to write a fake internship report for the former Minister of Justice Cho Kuk's son, Cho Won. Choe denied it, explaining that the ex-Justice Minister's son had really completed his internship course and therefore the report is definitely a real one. He also added that the prosecution threatened him to attend, otherwise they would reveal his real name in public. However, Kyunghyang Shinmun reported that while he was a lawyer, he once pled Chung Kyung-shim during a case of property succession. Before that, according to JoongAng Ilbo, he was in charge of personnel verification of Cho Kuk during the time of his appointment.

On 7 January 2020, the Liberty Korea Party (LKP; now the United Future Party aka UFP) filed a lawsuit against Choe for obstruction and breaching the Anti-graft Law. 16 days later, he was charged by the prosecution. On 22 April, he was again sued by a civic organisation for bribery.

On 28 January 2021, Choe was sentenced to 8 months in jail with a stay of execution for 2 years by the Seoul Central District Court.

Channel A broadcaster 
On 3 April 2020, Choe revealed a recorded transcript of Lee Dong-jae, a broadcaster of Channel A, on his Facebook.

On 10 April, the full recorded transcript was revealed. Nevertheless, 3 days later, Lee Bo-kyung, a worker of MBC, posted on her Facebook that the transcript disclosed by Choe was not true.

Personal life 
Choe was born in Namwon, North Jeolla in 1968 but was grown in Boseong and Yeosu in South Jeolla. He attended Jeolla High School in Jeonju and studied law at Seoul National University. His aunt, Choi Myung-hee, is a novelist known for Honbul. He is also a nephew-in-law to Chung Nam-ki, the former CEO of the Korea Press Foundation. His father is still living in Namwon.

Election results

General elections

References

External links 
 Choe Kang-wook on Facebook

1968 births
Living people
20th-century South Korean judges
Members of the National Assembly (South Korea)
21st-century South Korean lawyers